ROFOR is a format for reporting weather information. ROFOR is an abbreviation for "Route Forecast".  As the name suggests is the weather forecast of the route of any aircraft which will be flying through the route.  ROFOR contains various information regarding date and time of forecast, direction and speed of the wind, aerodrome ICAO code for which the forecast is made, cloud levels and freezing (icing) levels, turbulence and vertical wind shear information.

Example
Example of ROFOR report:

ROFOR 060300Z 0606/0612 KT VIDP 12580 2AC120 4CI300 7///180 403028 27010 405020 28015 407015 30020 410010 33025 523306 631209 11111 12775 40120 22222 38150 27115=

Interpretation of report:

References

Meteorological data and networks